The Pestalozzistrasse Synagogue, is a liberal synagogue in the German capital Berlin, at 14–15 Pestalozzistraße, in the Bezirk of Charlottenburg-Wilmersdorf.

History 

The synagogue was commissioned by Betty Sophie Jacobsohn and was built between 1911 and 1913; the architect was Ernst Dorn. It was at first independent, but in 1919 joined the Jüdischen Gemeinde zu Berlin.

The structure was severely damaged on the night of 9–10 November 1938, "Kristallnacht", but was not set on fire. Renovation work was begun shortly after the end of the Second World War, and the synagogue was re-dedicated on 14 September 1947.

Music 

Prayer services are accompanied by organ and choir. Much of the music used for the services was composed by Louis Lewandowski.

References

Further reading 
 
 

Jewish German history
Synagogues in Berlin
Synagogues completed in 1913
Reform synagogues in Germany
1913 establishments in Germany